A destructive tornado outbreak impacted the Great Plains and Midwestern United States on June 23–24, 1952, generating several significant (F2+) tornadoes. Most of the tornadoes and casualties occurred in June 23, when an F4 tornado injured four an Iowa and an F3 tornado killed two and injured six in Wisconsin. Minneapolis, Minnesota was struck by long-tracked F2 tornadoes on both outbreak days, causing a combined 25 injuries alone. Overall, at least seven tornadoes were confirmed, killing two, injuring 35, and causing $22.5 million in damage.

Meteorological synopsis
The outbreak was caused by two low-pressure systems in the region. The first one formed late on June 21 in Eastern Colorado. This low eventually moved slowly northeastward into Southern Nebraska on June 23 before accelerating and dissipating later that day over the Buffalo Ridge in Southwestern Minnesota's portion of Coteau des Prairies. As that low dissipated another low formed over Extreme Northwestern Kansas in the High Plains and tracked northeastward through the central part of Nebraska through June 24. Environmental conditions were favorable the development of localized severe thunderstorms, some of which became tornadic.

Confirmed tornadoes

June 23 event
Tornado researcher Thomas P. Grazulis listed an additional tornado:
An F3-level event destroyed an entire farmstead near Danube in Renville County, Minnesota. The tornado was also in the CDNS report. It is officially unrecorded.

June 24 event

Cleveland–Downtown Minneapolis–Lino Lakes, Minnesota

A long-tracked tornado, which was probably a tornado family, first touched down near Cleveland and moved northeastward, causing severe damage along its path. It moved through the southwestern part of the Minneapolis suburbs before entering Downtown Minneapolis. After moving through it, it continued northeastward, going through the northeastern suburbs of Minneapolis before dissipating near Lino Lakes. About 35 houses, barns, outbuildings, garages, large canvas tent, silos, windmills, steel granaries, farm machinery, and automobiles were destroyed while many other homes, buildings, barns, an automobile racing speedway, hangars, and several airplanes were damaged. Poultry and some livestock were killed, hundreds of trees uprooted, many poles, wires, radio and television antennae down, plate-glass windows were blown in and growing crops damaged. A number of reports of funnel-shaped clouds were observed and a large trailer truck heavily loaded with tombstones was lifted off the road in extreme southern Anoka County and wrecked. In all, 15 people were injured and losses total $5 million. Grazulis rated the tornado F3 and described the event as a complex of tornadoes and downbursts.

Non-tornadic impacts
Severe storms struck a large portion of the Central Plains, Great Lakes, and the Southeastern and Northeastern United States.There were 3 fatalities and 3 injuries.

See also
 List of North American tornadoes and tornado outbreaks
 List of tornadoes striking downtown areas

Notes

References

Tornadoes of 1952
F4 tornadoes
Tornadoes in Minnesota
Tornadoes in Iowa
Tornadoes in South Dakota
Tornadoes in Wisconsin